Hoseynabad-e Chaf (also Romanized as Ḩoseynābād-e Chāf) is a village in Chaf Rural District, in the Central District of Langarud County, Gilan Province, Iran. At the 2006 census, its population was 94, in 25 families.

References 

Populated places in Langarud County